The Battle Against Anarchist Terrorism: An International History, 1878–1934, is a book on the governmental campaign against anarchist terrorism written by Richard Bach Jensen and published in 2014 by Cambridge University Press.

Further reading

External links 

 

2014 non-fiction books
Books about terrorism
English-language books
History books about anarchism
Cambridge University Press books